Han Eum also known as Han Do was one of the four members (No In, Han Eum, Sam and Wang Gyeop) who operated the government of Wiman Joseon. His position was a chancellor. Since Han Eum had a family name, Han, it is believed that he was an exile from China or person related to China. Just like his master Ugeo who was the last king of Wiman Joseon.　In BC 109 to 108, when Han dynasty attacked Wiman Joseon, he was surrendered instantly together with those exiles from China, No In and Wang Gyeop, while leaving the King of Wiman Joseon Ugeo. After his surrender, Han dynasty nominated him as a peerage of  Jeok ja (Hangul:적자 Hanja:荻苴). He died after 19 years without a successor.

See also
Han conquest of Gojoseon

References

Source

註 042

Wiman Joseon people
Korean people of Chinese descent
Korean politicians
Year of birth unknown
89 BC deaths
2nd-century BC Korean people
1st-century BC Korean people